Fabrizio Poggi  (pronounced Pohjee) (born 1 July 1958) is a singer and harmonica player. A Grammy Awards nominee who has received the Hohner Lifetime Award, and has been two times Blues Music Awards nominee, Jimi Awards nominee, and during his long career has recorded twenty two albums.
He has performed in the US and Europe with the Blind Boys of Alabama, Garth Hudson of the Band, Steve Cropper, Charlie Musselwhite, Ronnie Earl, John P. Hammond, Marcia Ball, Guy Davis, Eric Bibb, Flaco Jimenez, Little Feat and many others.

Biography
Fabrizio Poggi's first recordings in the United States date back to 1997 in Texas with "Nuther World".

He was among the first Italian artists to do a long tour in the States. Between 1998 and 2002 he toured in Texas and Louisiana. Among the areas that hosted his performances were The House of Blues in New Orleans; Threadgill's; Antone's; Doctor Rockit's in Corpus Christi; Gruene Hall Gruene Hall; and Luckenbach.

In 2006, he performed at the Center for Southern Folklore, Memphis. On that occasion he played at Ground Zero- the Red's Lounge Clarksdale, the Walnut Street Blues Bar Greenville as well as Greenwood at the Blue Parrot. In the same year, he participated at the CBS television show "Live at 9" from Memphis, and hosted the legendary radio program "King Biscuit Time".

In 2010, Poggi released "Spirit & Freedom", recorded mostly in the United States. Among the guests are The Blind Boys of Alabama; Flaco Jimenez; Garth Hudson (The Band); Charlie Musselwhite; Augie Meyers; Eric Bibb; Guy Davis; Billy Joe Shaver; Tish Hinojosa; Mickey Raphael; Kevin Welch; Kelley Mickwee; Debbi Walton; and Nora Guthrie (Woody Guthrie's daughter).

In 2011, Poggi released "Live in Texas", an album recorded entirely live in Texas. Among the guest musicians on the disc: Flaco Jimenez; Marcia Ball; Floyd Domino; Ponty Bone; Debbi Walton; and Tommy Elskes.

He has published two books: Il soffio dell'anima (blues harmonica and blues harmonica players) published by Ricordi in 2005, and Angeli Perduti del Mississippi (stories and legends of the blues) published by Meridiano Zero in 2010, with the cover designed by Robert Crumb.

In 2011 and 2012, the US magazine, Blues Revue, chose for an insert CD attached to the magazine, along with North Mississippi All Stars, Mavis Staples, Ruthie Foster and Bob Margolin. Harpway 61, an instrumental album dedicated to the harmonica was released in May 2012. Spirit of Mercy a collection of blues and spiritual songs from previous albums Mercy and Spirit & Freedom was released in In February 2013. Actor and musician Dan Aykroyd, the Elwood Blues of the Blues Brothers, called Poggi "an extraordinary harmonica player" in his radio broadcast "TheBluesMobile". In September 2013, he appeared both as a musician and as producer for Guy Davis' Juba Dance, which premiered at the BBC in London. The album came in first place in the ranking of most broadcasts by American Radio, and the was nominated for the Blues Music Awards 2014 for Best Acoustic Album.

In 2014, he released Spaghetti Juke Joint featuring Ronnie Earl, Bob Margolin and Sonny Landreth.

2016 found him in Texas again to record Texas Blues Voices with such esteemed guests as Ruthie Foster; Miss Lavelle White; W.C. Clark; Carolyn Wonderland; Shelley King; Mike Zito; Bobby Mack; Donnie Price, and Dony Winn. In February 2016, he played at the Carnegie Hall with Guy Davis, Eric Burdon and Buddy Guy. In March 2017, MC Records released Sonny & Brownie's Last Train by Guy Davis and Fabrizio Poggi. A look back to Brownie McGhee and Sonny Terry. Poggi is also the producer of the record.

In November 2017, he was nominated for the 2018 Grammy Award for Best Traditional Blues Album of the Year.

In May 2018, he was nominated for a Blues Music Awards nominee for the album.

In June 2020, Appaloosa Records released For You. 

In December 2020 he was nominated as Artist of the Year by the American magazine, Bluebird Reviews. 

In February 2021 he was the first European to appear on the cover of the American magazine Blues Blast Magazine.

In May 2021, Appaloosa Records released Hope 

In November 2022, Appaloosa Records released Basement Blues

Discography

Albums

Collaborations
 Punk prima di te with Enrico Ruggeri
 Rock 'n' Rouge with Enrico Ruggeri
 Amore e Guerra with Enrico Ruggeri
 Sogni e tradimenti with Renato Franchi
 Careless Moonlight with Mike Blakely
 West of You with Mike Blakely
 Down in Texas' with Don McCalister
 All the Colours of My Blues with Mauro Sbuttoni
 Valigie di cartone with Germano Di Mattia
 The Rarest of the Breed with Mike Blakely
 The Hardest Truth with Penny Ney
 Sweet State of Mind  with Debbi Walton 
 Kokomo Kidd  with Guy Davis
 Merry Christmas with The Joey Williams Project (The Blind Boys of Alabama)
 Finestre with Renato Franchi & Orchestrina del Suonatore Jones 
 Le sette note del contrappasso with Matteo Bordiga Semplicemente Sacher - Sacher Quartet50/50 - Mora & BronskiOggi, Mi meritavo il mare - Renato Franchi & Orchestrina del Suonatore JonesMemphisto  - Hubert DorigattiBorder guards - Katleen ScheirOn the other side of water -  Luca BurgalassiA - BlindurMorning Songs & Midnight Lullabies - Gospel Book RevisitedStop - Hubert Dorigatti Country Blues From Nepal - Prakash Slim Piccolo Romanticismo Scapigliato - Verdecane 
 Papaveri Rossi For You - A Tribute to Bruce Springsteen 
 In terra Zapatista Bar Italia Soffi d'ancia 
 Celtica Volume 29 Suoni dal mondo Concerto per il centenario della Cigl 
 Concerto per la costituzione nata dalla Resistenza 
 Deep Down Blues 2 
 X-mas Evergreen Gospel Essentials, Vol. 2 
 Acoustic Sunday Afternoon 
 Blues Revue Cd Sampler Compilation April 2011  with the song I'm on My Way Blues Revue Cd Sampler Compilation April 2012 with the song King Biscuit Time Natale Pop 2001-2002-2003 Paviaphone
 The Blues Masters An Italian Tribute AAVV

References

External links
  Fabrizio Poggi'' at the Hohner website

Living people
Contemporary blues musicians
Harmonica players
1958 births